WII may refer to:
Wildlife Institute of India (WII)
Wii, a video game console released by Nintendo
Wii U, the Wii's successor
Wii (video game series), a series of games that start with "Wii"

See also

World War II (WWII)
WIII (disambiguation)